The Peaceful Assembly Act 2012 (abbreviated PAA) is the law which regulates public protests in Malaysia. According to the Barisan Nasional government, the Act allows citizens to organise and participate in assemblies peaceably and without arms, subject to restrictions deemed necessary and in the interest of public order and security.

The Act was drafted four months after the Bersih 2.0 rally and two months after the government announced its intention to amend the Police Act. It was tabled in Parliament on 22 November 2011, passed by the lower house on 29 November, and approved by the Senate on 20 December.

The PAA has been strongly criticised by the opposition, which says that the new law if passed will crackdown on the right to protest instead of safeguarding it. The Bar Council and various civil society leaders have also spoken out against the Act.

Background
Prime Minister Najib Razak promised multiple reform initiatives on his Malaysia Day address on 15 September 2011, including repealing the Internal Security Act and abolishing permits for the print media.

An editorial by the United Malays National Organisation (UMNO)-owned New Straits Times said the PAA "is a step, among recent others, [by Najib] to fulfil the promises made in his Malaysia Day address, which included a repeal of stringent laws that had outlived their usefulness." It said that the bill "will enable peaceful airings of grievances and other expressions through public assemblies" without being a "carte blanche for unruly street protests". According to the NST, this is a step by Najib "to take the country’s constitutional democracy to a higher and more mature plane."

While debating the law in Parliament, Najib described it as "revolutionary in nature and a giant leap in terms of improving on current laws." Two government members of parliament have hailed the proposed Act as a step towards the government becoming more accepting of public assemblies. Former Prime Minister Mahathir Mohamad praised the PAA as having "good intentions ... besides preventing certain quarters from taking advantage of a situation, so that violence does not become a problem to the country."

The PAA was passed by the Dewan Rakyat on 29 November 2011 with no dissenting votes after opposition members of parliament staged a walkout during the final debate. Some 500 people staged a protest outside Parliament during the vote. It was passed by 39–8 in the Dewan Negara on 20 December 2011.

Provisions
The PAA will replace Section 27 of the Police Act 1967, which means police permits for mass assemblies will no longer be required. Instead, organisers must notify the officer in charge of the police district (OCPD) within 10 days before the gathering date. The OCPD will respond to the notification within five days, outlining the restrictions and conditions imposed.

An organiser may appeal to the Minister of Home Affairs if he/she feels aggrieved by the restrictions and conditions and the minister will respond within two days. Any person convicted of failing to comply with the restrictions and conditions can be fined up to RM10,000.

The PAA also bans any assembly in the form of street protest.

Any person below the age of 21 cannot be an organiser. Any person below the age of 15 cannot participate in an assembly.

The proposed Act also bars any gathering within 50 m of "prohibited places" such as hospitals, petrol stations, airports, railway stations, places of worship and schools.

Structure
The Peaceful Assembly Act 2012, in its current form (as of 9 February 2012), consists of 6 Parts containing 27 sections and 4 schedules (including no amendment).
 Part I: Preliminary
 Part II: Right to Assemble Peaceably and Without Arms
 Part III: Responsibilities of Organizers, Participants and Police
 Part IV: Requirements on Organizing of Assembly
 Part V: Enforcement
 Part VI: Miscellaneous
 Schedules

First Schedule – Prohibited Places

 Dams
 Reservoirs
 Water catchment areas
 Water treatment plants
 Electricity generating stations
 Petrol stations
 Hospitals
 Fire stations
 Airports
 Railways
 Land public transport terminals
 Ports
 Canals
 Docks
 Wharves
 Piers
 Bridges
 Marinas
 Places of worship
 Kindergartens
 Schools

Second Schedule – Assemblies in which A Child May Participate
 Religious assemblies
 Funeral processions
 Assemblies related to custom
 Assemblies approved by the Minister

Third Schedule – Assemblies for which Notification Is Not Required
 Religious assemblies
 Funeral processions
 Wedding receptions
 Open houses during festivities
 Family gatherings
 Family day held by an employer for the benefit of his or her employees and their families
 General meetings of societies or associations

Criticism
Opposition leaders have called the PAA "undemocratic" and have asked for it to be withdrawn. Leader of the Opposition Anwar Ibrahim said the Bill "gives absolute powers to the police, with which the appeal rests with the minister. This is not democratic." Democratic Action Party MP Lim Kit Siang warned against "forcing" the Bill through Parliament without public consultation.

Bar Council president Lim Chee Wee said the new legislation is more restrictive than the present one. "History is full of civil disobedience and events, which have led to changes for the better in the country ... Processions or assemblies in motion are very much deep in the history of Malaysia ... which is why we urge the government — do not, with the stroke of the pen, strike back against the very foundation of this nation," he said.  On the day of voting, the Bar Council led hundreds of lawyers in a "Walk for Freedom" march from the Lake Gardens to Parliament house.

Bersih 2.0 leader Ambiga Sreenevasan has also voiced her opposition to the PAA, saying, "This Bill restricts our rights as much as possible.  It gives unfettered powers to the minister and the police to further restrict the freedom to assemble.  It impinges on free speech.  In short, it will stymie legitimate dissent in our country."

In 2014, Maina Kiai, the UN Special Rapporteur on the rights to freedom of peaceful assembly and of association, criticised the Peaceful Assembly Act's restrictions on youth and non-citizens in a report to the Human Rights Council. Kiai acknowledged that
there may be safety concerns when young people participate in some public assemblies, but wrote that Malaysia's laws were not tailored narrowly enough to specifically address that concern. He concluded that the blanket age-based bans were contrary to article 15 of the Convention on the Rights of the Child. He also criticised the law's prohibition against non-citizens taking part in peaceful assemblies, saying that "groups that are disenfranchised from mainstream political activities, such as voting and holding office, have an even greater need for alternative means to participate in the public sphere. Peaceful assemblies are an
important tool for allowing the voices of otherwise excluded groups to be heard."

Constitutionality 

In 2014, a three-judge panel of the second-highest court in the Malaysian judiciary, the Court of Appeal, declared Section 9(5) of the law unconstitutional in a challenge to the law brought by Selangor State Legislative Assembly deputy speaker Nik Nazmi Nik Ahmad. Nik Nazmi was charged with organising an assembly without providing authorities 10 days notice prior to the event. He faced a fine of RM10,000 under Section 9(5), which provides for criminal punishment of assembly organisers who do not provide 10 days notice of an assembly to the authorities. Nik Nazmi appealed his conviction to the Court of Appeal, which unanimously ruled that Section 9(5) of the law violated the constitutional right to peaceful assembly and acquitted Nik Nazmi.

One of the three-judge bench, Justice Mah Weng Kwai, wrote in his opinion that Section 9(1), which requires the 10-day notice period, is also unconstitutional. The other two judges, Justices Mohd Ariff Mohd Yusof and Hamid Sultan Abu Backer, penned separate judgments declaring that only Section 9(5) was unconstitutional. Ariff wrote: "The Section 9(1) requirement of 10 days' notice under the PAA is constitutional, but Section 9(5) that punishes peaceful assembly is unconstitutional." Hamid's opinion was that "The right to peaceful assembly is guaranteed under Article 10(1) (b) of the Federal Constitution and hence, it cannot be criminalised." Mah in his opinion called Section 9(5) a "mockery of the right to freedom of assembly."

However in 2015, a different three-judge panel of the Court of Appeal unanimously upheld the constitutionality of Section 9(5) in the case of politician R. Yuneswaran. Court of Appeal President Md Raus Sharif authored an unanimous judgment for the three-judge panel, which also included Justices Mohd Zawawi Salleh and Zamani A Rahim. Yuneswaran had been convicted of an offense under Section 9(5) and appealed the conviction, but when it reached the Court of Appeal, the court subsequently upheld both Yuneswaran's conviction and the constitutionality of Section 9(5), ruling that citizens are still able to exercise the constitutional right to peaceful assembly even subject to the penalties of Section 9(5). Yuneswaran's lawyer Sivarasa Rasiah told the press: "It is an unsatisfactory state of the law and against the normal judicial conventions, where you have one Court of Appeal basically overruling another Court of Appeal. That job should be left to the Federal Court."

Another politician, Member of Parliament for Ipoh Timor Thomas Su, was also charged under Section 9 of the act in 2013. After the ruling in Nik Nazmi's case, Su filed for dismissal of the charges, but received a dismissal not amounting to acquittal. Without a formal acquittal, he was subsequently charged again for the original offense in 2016. He then received an acquittal in 2018, when the Attorney General's Chambers withdrew the charges. According to Human Resources Minister M. Kulasegaran, the then recently-elected Pakatan Harapan government had instructed the Attorney General to review Section 9(1) of the Act, which was the provision under which Su had been charged. Su's lead counsel Ramkarpal Singh called Su's acquittal a positive step towards abolishing that provision, which he said "curtails freedom of speech."

References

External links
 Peaceful Assembly Act 2012 

Law enforcement in Malaysia
Malaysian federal legislation
2012 in Malaysian law